Eric Ethridge is a Canadian country pop singer and songwriter. He was previously signed to Anthem Records, and has released one album Good with Me.

Early life
Eric Ethridge was raised in Sarnia, Ontario and played football as a defensive end at the University of Western Ontario. Prior to pursuing a full-time career in music, Ethridge attended a chiropractic school in Toronto and worked as a chiropractor in Sarnia.

Career

Early career and self-titled EP
In 2016, he won the Canadian Country Music Association's Discovery Award.

In July 2018, he released his self-titled debut EP Eric Ethridge. The single "Liquor's Callin' the Shots" reached the top 30 of Canadian country radio. In August 2018, he won the Grand Prize in the 2018 Unsigned Only Music Competition for his song "Girl On Fire".

In November 2018, Ethridge signed a worldwide recording and publishing deal with ole, who placed him on their label, Red Dot. Further singles from the EP included "Makin' Me Crazy", "California", and "If You Met Me First", the latter two of which were certified Gold by Music Canada.

2020-present: Good with Me
In February 2020, Ethridge released his debut US single "Dream Girl", co-written by Dan + Shay. The track was then included on his April 2020 extended play Forever With You.

In August 2020, Ethridge released the single "Kiss Me Goodbye" On October 30, 2020, Ethridge released his debut full-length album Good with Me on Anthem Records (rebranded from Red Dot), which includes
the singles "Dream Girl", "Kiss Me Goodbye", and "Sad Songs".

In 2022, Ethridge signed a management deal with Workshop Music Group and independently released the single "Made in Mexico".

Personal life
Ethridge married fellow Canadian country singer-songwriter Kalsey Kulyk in December 2019. During the COVID-19 pandemic, the couple moved from Nashville, Tennessee into a van and performed under the "Love on the Road" banner throughout Canada.

Discography

Albums

Extended plays

Singles

Music videos

Awards and nominations

References

External links

Living people
Canadian country singer-songwriters
Musicians from Ontario
21st-century Canadian male singers
Anthem Records artists
People from Sarnia
Year of birth missing (living people)
Canadian male singer-songwriters
Western Mustangs football players